An operator of last resort is a business in the United Kingdom that operates a railway franchise, on behalf of the government, when a train operating company is no longer able to do so. , there are five such operators in England, Wales and Scotland.

Purpose
Under the Railways Act 1993, which privatised passenger operations in the United Kingdom, the government is required to maintain continuity of passenger rail services if a franchise is terminated. In some instances, the government has been able to negotiate for the existing franchisee to continue to operate the franchise on a management contract until it can be relet, as happened when GNER defaulted on the InterCity East Coast franchise in 2007.

Should this not be possible, the Department for Transport (DfT) in England (through DfT OLR Holdings), or the Scottish Government (through Scottish Rail Holdings) for the ScotRail franchise in Scotland, and the Welsh Government for the Wales & Borders franchise in Wales, is required to step in as the operator of last resort.

Structure
In July 2009, the DfT established Directly Operated Railways (DOR) as its operator of last resort for England. In November 2015, the DfT wound up DOR and appointed a partnership of Arup Group, Ernst & Young and SNC-Lavalin Rail & Transit.

Utilisation
Since privatisation in the mid-1990s there have been seven occasions when an operator of last resort has been appointed.

Current
London North Eastern Railway has operated the InterCity East Coast franchise since 2018, after Virgin Trains East Coast defaulted.
Northern Trains has operated the Northern franchise since 1 March 2020, after the Arriva Rail North franchise was terminated by the Department for Transport.
Transport for Wales Rail has been the Welsh Government's operator of last resort since 7 February 2021, after the Wales & Borders franchise operated by  KeolisAmey Wales became unviable as a result of the COVID-19 pandemic.
SE Trains has operated the South Eastern franchise since 17 October 2021, after the previous Govia-owned operator Southeastern (legally London & South Eastern Railway) was stripped of the franchise for not declaring £25 million of revenue. The new operator has continued to use the Southeastern brand.
ScotRail, controlled by Scottish Rail Holdings for Transport Scotland, has run the ScotRail franchise since 1 April 2022, after the previous operator Abellio ScotRail 7 year contract ended.

Past
South Eastern Trains operated the South Eastern franchise from 2003 until 2006, after the Connex South Eastern franchise was terminated by the Strategic Rail Authority.
East Coast operated the InterCity East Coast franchise from 2009 until 2015, after National Express East Coast defaulted.

Future
On 25 June 2023, Scottish Rail Holdings will take over Caledonian Sleeper from incumbent operator Serco.

References 

Department for Transport
Nationalisation in the United Kingdom
 
Post-privatisation British railway companies
Privatisation of British Rail
Railway companies of the United Kingdom